Jamenea "Jem" Ferrer is a Filipina volleyball player. She was a 3-time UAAP best setter awardee while playing for the Ateneo university Lady Eagles volleyball team. She was a member of Fab 5 together with Dzi Gervacio, Fille Cainglet–Cayetano, Gretchen Ho and A Nacachi.

Career
Ferrer won the UAAP Best Setter awards three times when she won the award in the 2009-2010 Season 72, 2010-2011 Season 73 and the 2012-2013 Season 75. She was the 2011 Shakey's V-League Season 8 1st Conference Finals Most Valuable Player, after guiding her team to the league championship.
 She began her professional career in the Philippine Super Liga, where she was the fifth overall draft pick for the PLDT Home TVolution Power Attackers. She played for the Shakey's V-League sister team - the PLDT Home Telpad Turbo Boosters.

Clubs
  Ateneo Lady Eagles (2009-2012)
  Smart-Maynilad Net Spikers (2013)
  PLDT (2013-2014)
  PLDT Home Ultera Ultra Fast Hitters (2014-2015)
  BaliPure Purest Water Defenders (2016)
  Perlas Spikers (2017–2021)
  Choco Mucho Flying Titans (2022-)

Awards

Individuals
 2009-2010 UAAP Season 72 "Best Setter"
 2010-2011 UAAP Season 73 "Best Setter"
 2011 Shakey's V-League Season 8 Open Conference "Best Setter"
 2011 Shakey's V-League Season 8 1st Conference "Finals Most Valuable Player"
 2011 Shakey's V-League Southeast Asian Club Invitational "Best Setter"
 2012-2013 UAAP Season 75 "Best Setter"
 2012 Shakey's V-League Season 9 1st Conference "Best Setter"

References

Filipino women's volleyball players
Living people
Ateneo de Manila University alumni
University Athletic Association of the Philippines volleyball players
Setters (volleyball)
Year of birth missing (living people)
21st-century Filipino women